Cooling capacity is the measure of a cooling system's ability to remove heat. It is equivalent to the heat supplied to the evaporator/boiler part of the refrigeration cycle and may be called the "rate of refrigeration" or "refrigeration capacity". As the target temperature of the refrigerator approaches ambient temperature, without exceeding it, the refrigeration capacity increases thus increasing the refrigerator's COP. The SI unit is watt (W).

The basic SI units equation for deriving cooling capacity is of the form:

Where
 is the cooling capacity [kW]
 is the mass rate [kg/s]
 is the specific heat capacity [kJ/kg K]
 is the temperature change [K]

References

Heating, ventilation, and air conditioning